Rudehen District is in Damavand County, Tehran province, Iran. At the 2006 National Census, its population was 27,031 in 7,776 households. The following census in 2011 counted 29,330 people in 8,939 households. At the latest census in 2016, the district had 41,104 inhabitants in 13,035 households.

References 

Damavand County

Districts of Tehran Province

Populated places in Tehran Province

Populated places in Damavand County

1996 establishments in Iran